Barrs may refer to:

People
 Alfred George Barrs
 Caroline Barrs, cricket player
 Frank Barrs (1871–1963), English cricket player
 Jay Barrs
 Vanessa Barrs, veterinary researcher

Places
 Barrs Court, Bristol, England
 Barrs Mills, Ohio, United States
 Barrs Run (Tenmile Creek tributary)
 Barss Corner, Nova Scotia, Canada